Gaddang or Ga'dang may be,

Gaddang people
Gaddang language
Ga'dang language